Private First Class Edward Gómez (August 10, 1932 – September 14, 1951) was a United States Marine from Omaha, Nebraska who posthumously received the Medal of Honor — the United States' highest decoration for valor — for gallantly sacrificing his life to save the lives of four fellow Marines on his machine gun team during the Battle of the Punchbowl. PFC Gomez was the 18th Marine to receive the Medal of Honor for heroism during the Korean War.

Early years
Gomez, a Mexican-American, attended Omaha High School before enlisting in the Marine Corps Reserve on August 11, 1949, at the age of 17. After recruit training at MCRD San Diego, California, he trained at Camp Pendleton, California, and went to Korea with the 7th Replacement Draft.

Medal of Honor citation

Awards and decorations
The United States' highest decoration for valor was awarded to Gomez for extraordinary heroism on September 14, 1951, at Kajon-ni, during the Battle of the Punchbowl when he smothered a hand grenade with his own body to prevent destruction of his Marine machine gun team. In addition to the Medal of Honor, PFC Gomez was awarded the Purple Heart with a Gold Star in lieu of a second award, the Korean Service Medal with bronze star, and the United Nations Service Medal.

Recognitions
Ed "Babe" Gomez Elementary School was named in his honor. It is located at 5101 S 17th St, Omaha, NE 68107. 
He also has an Avenue named after him on which several businesses are located and Metropolitan Community College South Campus.

See also

List of Medal of Honor recipients
List of Korean War Medal of Honor recipients
List of Hispanic Medal of Honor recipients
Hispanics in the United States Marine Corps

References

|

1932 births
1951 deaths
Korean War recipients of the Medal of Honor
United States Marine Corps Medal of Honor recipients
United States Marine Corps personnel of the Korean War
American military personnel killed in the Korean War
United States Marines
United States Marine Corps reservists
Military personnel from Omaha, Nebraska
Deaths by hand grenade
Omaha Central High School alumni